The Narragansett Trail is a  hiking trail in Connecticut and is one of the  Blue-Blazed Trails, maintained by the Connecticut Forest and Park Association and the Narragansett Council, and The Rhode Island chapter of the Boy Scouts of America.

The trail is located in the towns of Ledyard, Voluntown and North Stonington in eastern Connecticut as well the Connecticut/Rhode Island border and it traverses the Lantern Hill section of the Mashantucket Pequot Reservation, the Groton Sportsman Club, the Nature Conservancy's Gladys Foster Preserve, the Pachaug State Forest Green Falls Pond area and the Rhode Island Boy Scouts Narragansett Council Camp Yawgoog reservation property.

For fifteen and one half miles the Narragansett Trail is primarily a southwest-to-northeast trail.  At the easternmost end the trail becomes a north-to-south trail section which strictly follows the Connecticut/Rhode Island border south for one half mile.

Notable features include the summits of Lantern Hill and High Ledge. The trail goes near, but does not summit Cossaduck Hill and Pendleton Hill.

Trail description
The Narragansett Trail is a Blue-Blazed hiking trail and extends from Wintechog Road near the intersection with Connecticut Route 2 in Ledyard, Connecticut, to Green Fall Road in North Stonington at the Connecticut / Rhode Island state line. Much of the Narragansett Trail is on state land within the Pachaug State Forest.  The Narragansett Trail connects to public recreation areas maintained by the Connecticut Department of Environmental Protection at Green Falls Pond and Wyassup Lake in Pachaug State Forest.

Much of the Narragansett Trail is flat or has gradual ascents and descents and is suitable for casual walking or hiking, running - or snowshoeing in the winter. The steepest section is where the trail traverses the closed section of Flat Rock Road. The Narragansett Trail crosses streams and wetland areas that are subject to flooding in periods of significant rain and snow melt. The trail sections close to Hell Hollow Pond and Lockes Meadow Pond are low-lying areas which are often under water.

The trail connects to two other Blue-Blazed trails in Connecticut's Pachaug State Forest: in the Green Falls Pond area via the Green Falls Pond Loop connector trail—the Nehantic Trail and Pachaug Trail. The Green Falls Pond Loop trail and Narragansett Trail overlap for a section of the southern and eastern shores of Green Falls Pond.

The Narragansett Trail also connects to several non-Blue-Blazed Trails.
Near its western end it connects to and overlaps with sections of the Lantern Hill trail and loop trail as well as several unmarked trails.
The Tippecansett Trail and a Rhode Island extension of the Narragansett Trail connect to the Narragansett Trail at the Connecticut / Rhode Island state border.

Trail route

The western end of the Narragansett Trail starts on Wintechog Road in North Stonington, Connecticut, to the southeast of the Mashantucket Pequot Tribe's Foxwoods Casino in Ledyard, Connecticut. The trail climbs southward, connecting with the Lantern Hill trail and Lantern Hill Loop trail.  After climbing to the Lantern Hill summit the trail descends to the west and heads north-west.  It passes through the North Stonington Dog Pound and waste transfer station property before crossing Wintechog Road.  The trail continues north through woods and eventually passes through two open fields (meadows).  After the Gallup Pond dam bridge the trail crosses Connecticut Route 2.  There is a short road walk to and down Ryder Road to the trail entrance to Nature Conservancy's Gladys Foster parcel.  The trail continues to Yawbux Brook and an unnamed beaver pond before entering Pachaug State Forest.  The trail then joins Wyassup Lake Road at the Lake Wyassup boat launch.   From the Lake Wyassup boat launch, the trail climbs to the High Ledge plateau and then to the Legend Woods / Pendleton Hill area before crossing Connecticut Route 49.

Next the trail travels north-east through the private hunting preserve (and fishing pond) of the Groton Sportsmen Club (this Narragansett Trail section is closed from October to March according to posted signs), re-enters the Pachaug State Forest at Tom Wheeler Road and follows the Green Fall River (and ravine) north to Green Fall Pond.  The trail follows the south-east shore of the pond before leaving the shore of the pond to head east to the Rhode Island border.   At the border the trail turns ninety degrees to head south over a rock ridge over a cave.  After a half mile the trail's Connecticut section ends at a very small parking lot and state line marker where Green Fall Road becomes Yawgoog Road in Rhode Island.

There is a short (four mile) extension of the trail into Rhode Island which is blazed yellow.  This Narragansett Trail extension passes by the Long and Ell Ponds and passes through the Rockville Wildlife Management Area before ending at the former swimming area on Ashville Pond in Hopkinton, Rhode Island.  The Narragansett Trail used to continue to Rhode Island Route 138 in Kingston, Rhode Island.

Trail communities

The Narragansett Trail passes through land located within the following Connecticut municipalities, from west to east: Ledyard, Voluntown and North Stonington

Landscape, geology, and natural environment

Landscape in the area is generally low-lying and flat with some rolling hills. The most prominent features are Lantern Hill and the High Ledge plateau and rocks (containing some small caves).

In terms of animal wildlife numerous vultures and ravens can be spotted flying around the summit of Lantern Hill and black bear sightings have been reported in the Pachaug State Forest area near the state border.

The Pachaug State Forest Green Falls Pond area features large extents of undeveloped land, consisting of mature growths of hardwood and evergreens, along with swampy areas having extensive coverage by Mountain Laurel, Rhododendron and other shrubs and smaller trees.

The Narragansett Council (Rhode Island Boy Scouts of America chapter) property at the eastern end of the trail is similar to the Pachaug State Forest terrain.  In addition, the several swampy areas breed many biting insects including large horse-flies in season.

History and folklore

The Blue-Blazed Narragansett Trail was created by the Connecticut Forest and Park Association as part of the Blue-Blazed Hiking Trail system.
The eastern end of the original longer Pequot Trail blazed in the 1930s connected to the western end of the Narragansett Trail at the Lantern Hill section of the Mashantucket Peqout reservation.
The original "connected" Pequot and Narragansett Trails can be seen in the Connecticut Forest and Park Association's 1940 Connecticut Walk Book map of major trails.

The missing "gap" sections are on Mashantucket Pequot Tribal Nation property and are trails used for centuries by the Pequot tribe.
Plans are underway to lengthen the Pequot Trail and return the south-eastern terminus to its original location with the Narragansett Trail on Lantern Hill in North Stonington via the Mashantucket Pequot Tribal Nation property near their highly regarded museum and research center.

Origin and name
The original Blue-Blazed Hiking Trails were named after Native American people and place names, in recognition that many of the trails followed historic foot paths. Trails added since often follow this convention, so many of the BBHT's have Native American names.

The Narragansett are a tribe of Algonquian speaking people who occupy the area which is now western Rhode Island including the coast and islands in Narragansett Bay.  Members of the recognized tribe continue to occupy areas of eastern Connecticut near the current border with Rhode Island.

The word "Narragansett" means, "People of the Small Point."

For more information see the Narragansett name and language section of the Wikipedia article on the Narragansett Tribe.

Historic sites

The foundations for stone cellars that can be found along the route indicate that much of the landscape was used for settlements and farms up until the late nineteenth and early twentieth century, after which much of the land was allowed to return to forests. In particular stone foundations and extensive stone walls can be found off of the trail east of High Ledge in the Legend Woods area.

Pachaug State Forest was the first state forest in Connecticut and grew quickly in acreage primarily because many of the farmers and landholders in the area realized that their soil was poor for farming and sold their land to the state in the 1920s and 1930s.

Folklore
The town name of Voluntown is attributed to the fact that it was settled by Volunteers of the Narragansett War in 1700 who received land grants to settle there. The land was remote and difficult to farm and many of the original settlements were subsequently abandoned, so stone walls and foundations can be found throughout the forest today.

Hiking the trail

The mainline trail is blazed with blue rectangles. Trail descriptions are available from a number of commercial and non-commercial sources, and a complete guidebook is published by the Connecticut Forest and Park Association. More information can be found on the CFPA website (http://ctwoodlands.org/blue-blazed-hiking-trails) including updates on trail conditions and closure or restrictions. Contact information is also available on the site for trail users to report adverse trail conditions or submit other feedback or questions.

Weather along the route is typical of Connecticut. Conditions on exposed ridge tops and summits may be harsher during cold or stormy weather. Lightning is a hazard on exposed summits and ledges during thunderstorms. Snow is common in the winter and may necessitate the use of snowshoes. Ice can form on exposed ledges and summits, making hiking dangerous without special equipment.

Landscape is low-lying and trails cross wetland areas. Extensive rain and snow melt will lead to wet and muddy conditions, and in this case fairly high waterproof boots are recommended.

Currently, hiking through the property owned by Groton Rod and Gun Club is prohibited. The trail that runs between Route 49 and Tom Wheeler Rd, (Groton Rod and Gun property) can be avoided by walking Pendleton Hill Road to Sand Hill Road to Tom Wheeler Road and rejoining the trail on Tom Wheeler Road.

Biting insects can be bothersome during warm weather. Parasitic deer ticks (which are known to carry Lyme disease) are a potential hazard. Encounter with small wildlife is always possible and hikers should be alert to signs of erratic behavior or other disease symptoms and take evasive action if warranted.

Seasonal hunting is permitted on state forest land, so wearing bright orange clothing during the hunting season (Fall through December) is advised.

State regulations govern use of state forest land. The land, plants and animals should generally be left undisturbed, especially endangered and protected species.  For guidelines on how to act during a black bear encounter please view the American Bear Association hiking and camping awareness page.

Conservation and maintenance of the trail corridor

Much of the trail is flooded or muddy. There are sections filled with stones and other evidence of erosion which has occurred when the trail has turned into a temporary stream.

There is also evidence of use by all terrain vehicles (ATVs), dirt bikes and horses.  Some sections of the Narragansett trail are explicitly multi-use  (paved roads, dirt/gravel forest roads, jeep trails and the Enduro off-road motorcycle trail which winds through Pachaug State Forest), but in other sections there is clearly unauthorized vehicular and equestrian use.

The 58 mile Enduro trail in Pachaug State Forest is marked (on turns and intersections on trees) with white labels containing a red arrow pointing in the trail's direction.  The route follows a mix of forest trails and public roads (therefore requiring both a valid current motorcycle registration and motorcycle driver's license rather than ATV registration).

Recognition/inspiration programs
There is a State of Connecticut Department of Environmental Protection letterbox hidden close to the trail on the High Ledge plateau.

Image gallery

See also
 Blue-Blazed Trails
 Foxwoods
 Pequot Trail
 Nehantic Trail
 Pachaug Trail
 Pachaug State Forest
 Lantern Hill
 Mashantucket Pequot Tribe
 Narragansett (tribe)

Bibliography

References

Further reading

External links

Trail Maps:
 CT DEP - Green Falls Area Map
 CT DEP - Pachaug State Forest Enduro Motorcycle Trail Topo Map

Specific to this trail:
 "Hiking a regular pastime at Narragansett Trail", MetroWest Daily News, Sept. 6, 2007
 CT DEP - Letterbox Clues for Pachaug State Forest
 CT DEP - Wyassup Lake Boat Launch, North Stonington

Nearby areas and the Pachaug State Forest:
 Narragansett Council BSA - Boy Scouts of America Rhode Island Chapter
 Groton Sportsmen Club
 Mashantucket Pequot Tribe
 Pequot Tribe History  - First Nations Issues of Consequence
 Narragansett Tribe History - First Nations Issues of Consequence
 CT DEP-Pachaug State Forest
 CT DEP-Green Falls Area
 North Stonington Historical Society

Connecticut hikes and related information:
 Connecticut Forest and Park Association
 CT Museum Quest

 

Hiking trails in Connecticut
Protected areas of New London County, Connecticut
Ledyard, Connecticut
Voluntown, Connecticut
North Stonington, Connecticut
Blue-Blazed Trails